The 1952 NYU Violets football team represented New York University in the 1952 college football season. This was the last season that NYU fielded an NCAA team.

Schedule

References

NYU
NYU Violets football seasons
NYU Violets football